Air changes per hour, abbreviated ACPH or ACH, or air change rate is the number of times that the total air volume in a room or space is completely removed and replaced in an hour. If the air in the space is either uniform or perfectly mixed, air changes per hour is a measure of how many times the air within a defined space is replaced each hour. Perfectly mixed air refers to a theoretical condition where supply air is instantly and uniformly mixed with the air already present in a space, so that conditions such as age of air and concentration of pollutants are spatially uniform.

In many air distribution arrangements, air is neither uniform nor perfectly mixed. The actual percentage of an enclosure's air which is exchanged in a period depends on the airflow efficiency of the enclosure and the methods used to ventilate it. These systems range from a conceptual system of perfect displacement, which removes and replaces all air in a space, to a short circuit flow in which very little of the existing air is replaced. The actual amount of air changed in a well mixed ventilation scenario will be 63.2% after 1 hour and 1 ACH. In order to achieve equilibrium pressure, the amount of return air (air leaving the space) and the amount of supply air (air entering the space) must be the same.

Definitions

Formulas

Air changes per hour
In Imperial units:

where:
ACPH = number of air changes per hour; higher values correspond to better ventilation
Q = Volumetric flow rate of air in cubic feet per minute (cfm)
Vol = Space volume L × W × H, in cubic feet 

In metric units

where:
ACPH = number of air changes per hour; higher values correspond to better ventilation
Q = Volumetric flow rate of air in liters per second (L/s)
Vol = Space volume L × W × H, in cubic meter

Ventilation rates
Ventilation rates are often expressed as a volume rate per person (CFM per person, L/s per person). The conversion between air changes per hour and ventilation rate per person is as follows:

where:
Rp = ventilation rate per person (cubic feet per minute (CFM) per person or cubic meters per minute per person)
ACPH = Air changes per hour
D = Occupant density (square feet per occupant or square meters per occupant)
h = Ceiling height (feet or meters)

One cubic meter per minute = 16.67 liter/second

Air change rate recommendations
Air change rates are often used as rules of thumb in ventilation design. However, they are seldom used as the actual basis of design or calculation.  For example, residential ventilation rates are calculated based on area of the residence and number of occupants. Non-residential ventilation rates are based on floor area and number of occupants, or a calculated dilution of known contaminants.  Hospital design standards use air changes per hour. Recommended air changes rates can be found in relevant standards.

Methods of Measurement 
Air changes per hour is a measurement intended to communicate the air change effectiveness of a space’s ventilation system. Discussion around the ASHRAE standard 62, Ventilation for Acceptable Indoor Air Quality led to the development of a more direct method of measuring air change effectiveness with the use of a tracer gas. A tracer gas is a small amount of easily-detected gas which is mixed with air in order to study airflow patterns.
This method directly compares the age of the air where occupants breathe to the age of air that would occur were the air of the space perfectly mixed. The method is designed to more accurately understand the effects of air-flow patterns within a space, to identify or avoid such occurrences as short-circuiting airflow patterns, in which most of the supply air goes directly to the exhaust, and fails to mix with the air already present.

There are two ways to apply this method; the most commonly used technique, Tracer Gas Decay (step-down), consists of a short burst of gas injected into the space to establish a constant concentration within the building, then injection is stopped and concentration decay at a certain position is recorded, and second Tracer Gas Step-Up,where tracer gas is injected at a constant rate and the concentration response at a certain position is recorded

Airtightness in Building 
The most common technique to measure airtightness is the fan pressurization method, also known as the blower door test. It is measured by the number of air changes per hour (ACH) that occur when there is a differential pressure of 50 pascals between outside and inside the building. If an air volume equal to the inside volume of the building flows across the envelope in one hour, then ACH = 1. Airtightness improves buildings' energy performance since low airtightness levels imply high infiltration rates, draughts, risk of condensation, and moisture accumulation, and other effects. For this reason, the Passive House standard established performance requirements for airtightness requiring be less than 0.6 ACH with a pressure difference between inside and outside of 50 Pa.

Effects of ACH due to forced ventilation in a dwelling 
Forced ventilation to increase ACH becomes a necessity to maintain acceptable air quality as occupants become reluctant to open windows due to behavioural changes such as keeping windows closed for security.

Air changes are often cited as a means of preventing condensation in houses with forced ventilation systems often rated from 3 - 5 ACH though without referencing the size of the house. However, where ACH is already greater than 0.75 a forced ventilation system is unlikely to be of use at controlling condensation and instead insulation or heating are better remedies. Seven out of eight houses studied in NZ in 2010 had an ACH (corrected for ventilation factors) of 0.75 or greater. The presence of forced ventilation systems has been shown in some cases to actually increase the humidity rather than lower it. By displacing air inside a dwelling with infiltrated air (air brought in from outside the dwelling), positive pressure ventilation systems can increase heating (in winter) or cooling (in summer) requirements in a house. For example, to maintain a 15 °C temperature in a certain dwelling about 3.0 kW of heating are required at 0 ACH (no heat loss due to warmed air leaving the dwelling, instead heat is lost due to conduction or radiation), 3.8 kW at 1 ACH and 4.5 kW are required at 2 ACH. The use of roof space for heating or cooling was seen as ineffectual with the maximum heating benefits occurring in winter in more southerly regions (being close to the South Pole in these southern hemisphere reports) but being equivalent only to about 0.5 kW or the heating provided by about five 100 W incandescent light bulbs; cooling effects in summer were similarly small and were more pronounced for more northerly homes (being closer to the equator); in all cases the values assumed that the ventilation system automatically disengaged when the infiltrating air was warmer or cooler (as appropriate) than the air already in the dwelling as it would otherwise exacerbate the undesirable conditions in the house.

References

Industrial hygiene
Heating, ventilation, and air conditioning
Units of temporal rate